Brachystegia bakeriana is a species of plant in the family Fabaceae. It is found in Angola and Zambia. It is threatened by habitat loss.

Taxonomy
The Latin specific epithet bakeriana is in honor of the English botanist Edmund Gilbert Baker.

References

bakeriana
Flora of Angola
Flora of Zambia
Miombo
Trees of Africa
Vulnerable flora of Africa
Taxonomy articles created by Polbot